John David Chapman, better known as J D Chapman (born  March 17, 1983), is a US-American heavyweight boxer.

Career
Chapman is a heavyweight boxer. Chapman never fought as an amateur and started in toughman competitions before he turned pro in 2002 under the name "The Natural". Chapman hails from Arkansas, "The Natural State".
He was trained at first by Michael Moorer then by Jeff Mayweather and now by Norman Wilson; his manager is the very powerful Scott Hirsch who recently netted his fighters Jameel McCline and Shannon Briggs Don King-arranged title fights. Hirsch seems determined to keep Chapman out of harm's way and move him along slowly.

Chapman's opposition has been less than imposing so far; he is 28-0 but never faced a contender.
None of Chapman's first fifteen opponents had a positive record, but his last twelve opponents at least all had winning records.
His most notable opponents so far are Chicago-based Edward Gutierrez who was 15-0-1 coming into the bout, New York veteran John Carlo who possessed a 14-1 record, and fellow undefeated Mid-West prospect Matt Hicks 7-0. He has captured several regional heavyweight titles including the IBF Southern Regional title, the North American Boxing Council title, the WBC Latino title and the Arkansas State title.

His relationship with the very well connected Hirsch has netted him valuable exposure in the boxing press as a real heavyweight prospect. He has been featured repeatedly on television and received a WBC World Rating of 14. Chapman obviously denies the claim and states that the reality is that he rejected the $100,000 offer for the fight as being too low. The fact that the offer was a 'career high purse' is moot given that the purse for a first significant title fight always guarantees a fighter his first career high purse, by logical necessity.

The offer referenced above was a $500,000 offer but David was told it was for $100,000. This is why David didn't take the fight. In addition, this was not a title fight, but David Haye was trying to add credibility to his bid to become a legitimate heavyweight. JD told me he would have to knock out David Haye to win the fight, sensing with Haye's connections in England generally and ties to the promotion, a decision would be out of the question. Also, when David did not go, his owner stopped all support and assistance. And David was threatened by a co-worker if he didn't take the fight for $100,000. With all the drama and threats, JD decided to hang it up. He thought he had put his family through enough and didn't want to risk harming any of them.

References

External links
 Boxing Scene article
 
Doghouseboxing article
EastSideBoxing article

1983 births

Heavyweight boxers
Living people
Place of birth missing (living people)
American male boxers